The India–Pakistan rivalry is one of the most intense sports rivalries in the world. Any sport involving these two sides, form one of the most intense sports rivalries in the world, especially cricket. The tense relations between the two nations which emerged from bitter diplomatic relationships and conflict that originated during the Partition of British India into India and Pakistan in 1947, the Indo-Pakistani Wars, and the Kashmir conflict established the foundations for the emergence of an intense sporting rivalry between the two nations.

Asian Games 

India and Pakistan first participated in the 1951 and 1954 Asian Games respectively. India hosted 1951 and 1982 Asian Games.

As of 2018 Asian Games

Bold indicates most wins

Association Football 

India faced Pakistan for the first time at the international stage in the last game of the 1952 Colombo Cup, the both sides settled for a goalless draw and emerged as joint winners of the tournament after finishing first and second respectively.

Summary of Overall Results

Men's matches 
As of 2 April 2022

Bold indicates most wins

Most Goals
 India: 37 Goals
 Pakistan: 18 Goals

Women's matches 
As of 8 September 2022

Bold indicates most wins
Most Goals
 India : 17 Goals
 Pakistan: 0 Goal

Commonwealth Games 

The Commonwealth Games, often referred to as the Friendly Games, are a quadrennial international multi-sport event among athletes from the Commonwealth of Nations. India and Pakistan participated their first commonwealth games in 1934 and 1954 respectively. India hosted the 2010 Commonwealth Games in New Delhi.

As of 2022 Commonwealth Games

Bold indicates most wins

Cricket 

The two sides first played in 1952, when Pakistan toured India. Test and, later, limited overs series have been played ever since, although a number of planned tours by both sides have been cancelled or aborted due to political factors. No cricket was played between the two countries between 1962 and 1977 due to two major wars in 1965 and 1971 and the 1999 Kargil War and the 2008 Mumbai terrorist attacks have also interrupted cricketing ties between the two nations.

Head to Head in ICC tournament

Head to Head in ACC Tournament

Overall Summary of results

Hockey 

The rivilary is among the most intense sports rivalries in the Asia and the world in the sport of field hockey. They participate in Asian Games, Commonwealth Games, Asia Cup, Champions Trophy, Sultan Azlan Shah Cup, World Cup and the Summer Olympic Games.

Head to Head in Tournaments

Summary of overall results

Kabbadi 

It is popular in the Indian subcontinent and other surrounding Asian countries. Although accounts of kabaddi appear in the histories of ancient India, the game was popularised as a competitive sport in the 20th century.

Men's

Women's

Olympics 

India and Pakistan first participated in the 1900 and 1948 Olympic Games respectively.

As of 2020 Summer Olympics Pakistan hasn't won a medal since 1992

Bold indicates most wins

See also 
List of sports rivalries
India–Pakistan relations
Sport in India
Sport in Pakistan

Notes

References 

India–Pakistan relations
India–Pakistan sports rivalries
Sport in India